is a Japanese professional baseball player. He was born on December 15, 1983. He debuted in 2010. He had 59 strikeouts in 2013 for the Yomiuri Giants.

References

External links

Living people
1983 births
Baseball people from Fukushima Prefecture
Japanese baseball players
Nippon Professional Baseball pitchers
Hokkaido Nippon-Ham Fighters players
Yomiuri Giants players
Japanese baseball coaches
Nippon Professional Baseball coaches